Constantin Chiru (born 4 September 1957) is a Romanian weightlifter. He competed in the men's featherweight event at the 1980 Summer Olympics.

References

External links
 

1957 births
Living people
Romanian male weightlifters
Olympic weightlifters of Romania
Weightlifters at the 1980 Summer Olympics
Sportspeople from Bucharest
20th-century Romanian people
21st-century Romanian people